The plateau spotted whiptail (Aspidoscelis septemvittatus) is a species of lizard found in the southern United States in Texas, and in northern Mexico in Chihuahua and Coahuila. It is known to hybridize with the Eastern Spotted Whiptail, Cnemidophorus gularis, but is considered to be a distinct species due to phenotypic characteristics.

Description 
The Plateau spotted whiptail grows from 8 to 12.5 inches. It has an overall dark green, dark brown or black coloration with 6-7 cream colored stripes that run down the body from head to tail, sometimes with white spotting between stripes. Their underside is typically white or pale blue, and females often have an orange throat. They have a slender body, with a tail that is nearly three times their body length.

Behavior 
Like other species of whiptail lizard, the Plateau spotted whiptail is diurnal and insectivorous. They are wary, energetic, and fast moving, darting for cover if approached. It is found primarily in semi-arid canyonlands and rocky desert foothills. Breeding takes place in the spring, with females laying eggs in the mid summer, which hatch six to eight weeks later.

References 

Herps of Texas: Cnemidophorus septemvittatus

Aspidoscelis
Reptiles of the United States
Reptiles of Mexico
Reptiles described in 1892
Taxa named by Edward Drinker Cope
Taxobox binomials not recognized by IUCN 

fr:Aspidoscelis septemvittata